Cambazlı is an archaeological site in Mersin Province, Turkey

Geography 
It is situated in a village with the same name. Administratively, it is part of Silifke district of Mersin Province.

History 

The original name of the settlement is not known. But it was an important settlement because it was connected to other important ancient settlements like Corycus and Diocaesarea by Roman roads.  Although It  dates back to late Hellenistic age, it was also inhabited during the Roman and Byzantine eras.

The ruins 

There are ruins of mausoleums, rock tombs and cisterns around the village. But the most important building is a 13x 20 m early Byzantine era (5th century) basilica with three naves. The columns with Corinth type headings in the southern side as well as the apse a part of the walls are standing; but the columns in the northern side have been demolished.

External links 

Over 100 pictures of the church
Pictures of the monumental graves
Extensive photographic survey, description, and plan of Canbazlı Basilica

References

Silifke District
Archaeological sites in Mersin Province, Turkey
Byzantine sites in Turkey
Olba territorium